Sar Zeh-ye Sofla (also Romanized as Sar Zeh-ye Soflá; also known as Sar Zeh and Sarzeh-ye Pā’īn) is a village in Rudkhaneh Rural District, Rudkhaneh District, Rudan County, Hormozgan Province, Iran. At the 2006 census, its population was 124, in 26 families.

References 

Populated places in Rudan County